Samuel Alken Sr. (London 22 October 1756 – 9 November 1815 London) was an English artist, a leading exponent of the newly developed technique of aquatint.

History
Samuel Alken entered the Royal Academy Schools, London, as a sculptor in 1772. He published A New Book of Ornaments Designed and Etched by Samuel Alken in 1779, and later established himself as one of the most competent engravers in the new technique of aquatint.

His works included plates after George Morland, Richard Wilson, Thomas Rowlandson and Francis Wheatley. His plates for Sixteen views of the lakes in Cumberland and Westmorland  after drawings  John Emes and John Smith  were  published in 1796, and a set of aquatint views of North Wales  after drawings by the Rev. Brian Broughton  in 1798.

Relatives
The Alken family claims several well-known artists.

See also
Henry Thomas Alken

Bibliography
S. T. Prideaux: Aquatint Engraving (London, 1909, rev. 1968)
M. D. George: A Catalogue of Political and Personal Satires, London, B.M. cat., vii (London, 1942)

References

1756 births
1815 deaths
Painters from London
Animal artists
18th-century English painters
English male painters
19th-century English painters
19th-century English male artists
18th-century English male artists